Richard Dandy (born 30 November 1977) is a former English cricketer. Dandy was a right-handed batsman. He was born at Birmingham, Warwickshire.

Dandy represented the Warwickshire Cricket Board in a single List A match against the Leicestershire Cricket Board in the 2001 Cheltenham & Gloucester Trophy. In his only List A match, he was dismissed for a duck.

References

External links
Richard Dandy at Cricinfo

1977 births
Living people
People from Warwickshire
English cricketers
Warwickshire Cricket Board cricketers
English cricketers of the 21st century
Cricketers from Birmingham, West Midlands